Keith Follesé (born 1951 in Minneapolis, Minnesota) is an American songwriter and co-founder of Midas Records Nashville.

Early in his career, Follesé recorded with his wife, Adrienne, on A&M Records. They never released an album, and moved to Los Angeles, California. There, Follesé tried to form a band while raising his family, but later moved to Nashville, Tennessee after being persuaded by a friend.

Songs that Follesé co-wrote include "Before You Kill Us All" by Randy Travis, "Life Goes On" by Little Texas and four songs that went to number one between 1999 and 2000: "Something Like That" by Tim McGraw, "I Love You" by Martina McBride, "Smile" by Lonestar, and "The Way You Love Me" by Faith Hill.

In November 2001, Follesé was named Songwriter of the Year by the American Society of Composers, Authors and Publishers (ASCAP). Follesé founded the Midas Records Nashville label in 2005 with Brad Allen.

Follesé's sons, Ryan and Jamie, are members of the pop music band Hot Chelle Rae.

His son Ryan is also a country solo artist now as well.

References

American country songwriters
American male songwriters
Living people
Musicians from Minneapolis
1951 births
Songwriters from Minnesota